The Black Bird is a 1975 comedy film written and directed by David Giler and starring George Segal and Stéphane Audran. It is a comedic sequel to the John Huston film version of The Maltese Falcon (1941) with Segal playing Sam Spade's son, Sam Spade, Jr., and Lee Patrick and Elisha Cook Jr. reprising their roles of Effie Perrine and Wilmer Cook. It was Giler's first and only directorial effort.

Plot
When San Francisco private detective Sam Spade dies, his son, Sam, Jr., inherits his father's agency, including the sarcastic secretary, Effie Perine (also known as "Godzilla"). He must also continue his father's tradition of "serving minorities". When Caspar Gutman is killed outside Spade's building, his dying words are, "It's black and as long as your arm."

Spade is given an offer by a member of the Order of St. John's Hospital to purchase his father's useless copy of the Maltese Falcon. A thug named Gordon Immerman has been hired to make sure Spade delivers the bird. Spade later gets an offer from Wilmer Cook for the Falcon, but before they can negotiate, Cook is killed. Shortly thereafter Spade meets a beautiful and mysterious Russian woman named Anna Kemidov, daughter of the general who once owned the real Maltese Falcon. She also wants Spade's copy and is willing to seduce him to get it. Spade is soon dealing with Litvak, a bald Nazi dwarf who is surrounded by an army of Hawaiian thugs. In the ensuing chaos, Immerman tries to become Spade's partner. Spade discovers that his "false" copy may be the real thing.

Cast
 George Segal as Sam Spade, Jr.
 Stéphane Audran as Anna Kemidov
 Lionel Stander as Gordon Immerman
 Lee Patrick as Effie
 Elisha Cook, Jr. as Wilmer Cook
 Felix Silla as Litvak
 Signe Hasso as Dr. Crippen
 John Abbott as DuQuai
 Connie Kreski as Decoy Girl
 Howard Jeffrey as Kerkorian
 Ken Swofford as Brad McCormack

Production
Ray Stark owned the rights to The Maltese Falcon and hired David Giler to adapt. Giler tried to work on the script with his friend John Milius but they were unable to collaborate. Giler then decided to turn the project into a comedy, and Stark let him direct. It was his first and only directorial effort. During principal photography, frequent clashes occurred between Stark and star George Segal.

Lee Patrick and Elisha Cook, Jr., reprised their roles from the John Huston version of The Maltese Falcon (1941).

Reception
Panned by critics and audiences alike, the film is considered the weakest adaptation of the novel. Pauline Kael wrote that it is "a dumb comedy, with an insecure tone and some good ideas mixed with some terrible ones".

See also
 List of American films of 1975

References

External links
 
 
 

1975 films
1970s parody films
1970s comedy mystery films
American detective films
American parody films
American sequel films
Color sequels of black-and-white films
Columbia Pictures films
American comedy mystery films
1970s English-language films
Films based on American novels
Films set in San Francisco
Films scored by Jerry Fielding
1975 comedy films
1970s American films